Silvanoprus angusticollis is a species in the family Silvanidae ("silvanid flat bark beetles"), in the order Coleoptera ("beetles").
It is found in North America.

References

Further reading
 Arnett, R.H. Jr., M. C. Thomas, P. E. Skelley and J. H. Frank. (eds.). (2002). American Beetles, Volume II: Polyphaga: Scarabaeoidea through Curculionoidea. CRC Press LLC, Boca Raton, FL.
 Richard E. White. (1983). Peterson Field Guides: Beetles. Houghton Mifflin Company.
 Ross H. Arnett. (2000). American Insects: A Handbook of the Insects of America North of Mexico. CRC Press.
 Thomas, Michael C. (1993). "The Flat Bark Beetles of Florida (Coleoptera: Silvanidae, Passandridae, Laemophloeidae)". Arthropods of Florida and Neighboring Land Areas, vol. 15, vii + 93.

Silvanidae
Beetles described in 1876